Joelle R. Fishman (born December 5, 1946) is an American politician, writer and editor.

Political career
Fishman currently chairs the Connecticut Communist Party USA.  She also serves as a Commissioner on the City of New Haven Peace Commission.  She is a member of the executive board of the Alliance of Retired Americans in Connecticut.   From 1973 to 1982, she was the Communist Party candidate for Connecticut's Third Congressional District.  She has been a member of the Central Committee of the Communist Party of the United States.

Personal life
She was born in 1946 in Camden, New Jersey. She graduated from Douglass College (the women's college at Rutgers University). She has lived in New Haven since 1968.

References

1946 births
Living people
Politicians from Camden, New Jersey
Politicians from New Haven, Connecticut
Rutgers University alumni
American communists
Writers from Camden, New Jersey
Writers from New Haven, Connecticut